DXFX (96.3 FM), broadcasting as 96.3 Star FM, is a radio station owned and operated by Bombo Radyo Philippines through its licensee People's Broadcasting Service, Inc. Its studio, offices and transmitter are located at Bombo Radyo Broadcast Center, San Pedro St., Davao City.

References

Radio stations established in 1993
Radio stations in Davao City
Bombo Radyo Philippines